Squadron leader (Sqn Ldr in the RAF ; SQNLDR in the RAAF and RNZAF; formerly sometimes S/L in all services) is a commissioned rank in the Royal Air Force and the air forces of many countries which have historical British influence. It is also sometimes used as the English translation of an equivalent rank in countries which have a non-English air force-specific rank structure. 

An air force squadron leader ranks above flight lieutenant and immediately below wing commander and it is the most junior of the senior officer ranks.  The air force rank of squadron leader has a NATO ranking code of OF-3, equivalent to a lieutenant-commander in the Royal Navy or a major in the British Army or the Royal Marines. The equivalent rank in the Women's Auxiliary Air Force, Women's Royal Air Force (until 1968) and Princess Mary's Royal Air Force Nursing Service (until 1980) was "squadron officer".

Squadron leader has also been used as a cavalry command appointment (UK) and rank (France) since at least the nineteenth century. In Argentina it is used as a command appointment by both the army's cavalry and by the air force's flying units. The cavalry rank of squadron leader in France is also an OF-4 equivalent to a major, and the cavalry appointment of squadron leader in the UK generally corresponds to this rank as well.

Origins
The rank originated in the British Royal Air Force and was adopted by several other air forces which use, or used, the RAF rank system.

On 1 April 1918, the newly created RAF adopted its officer rank titles from the British Army, with Royal Naval Air Service lieutenant commanders and Royal Flying Corps majors becoming majors in the RAF. In response to the proposal that the RAF should use its own rank titles, it was suggested that the RAF might use the Royal Navy's officer ranks, with the word "air" inserted before the naval rank title. For example, the rank that later became squadron leader would have been air lieutenant commander. However, the Admiralty objected to this modification of their rank titles. The rank title squadron leader was chosen as squadrons were typically led by RAF majors and the term squadron commander had been used in the Royal Naval Air Service. The rank of squadron leader was introduced in August 1919 and has been used continuously since then.

RAF usage
From 1 April 1918 to 31 July 1919, the RAF used major as the equivalent rank to squadron leader. Royal Naval Air Service lieutenant-commanders and Royal Flying Corps majors on 31 March 1918 became RAF majors on 1 April 1918.  On 31 August 1919, the RAF rank of major was superseded by squadron leader which has remained in continuous usage ever since. Promotion to squadron leader is strictly on merit, and requires the individual to be appointed to a Career Commission, which will see them remain in the RAF until retirement or voluntary resignation.

Before the Second World War, a squadron leader commanded a squadron of aircraft. Today, however, a flying squadron is usually commanded by a wing commander, with each of the two flights under a squadron leader. However, ground-operating squadrons which are sub-divisions of a wing are ordinarily commanded by a squadron leader. This includes squadrons of the RAF Regiment and University Air Squadrons.

Insignia and command flag
The rank insignia consists of a thin blue band on a slightly wider black band between two narrow blue bands on slightly wider black bands. This is worn on both the lower sleeves of the tunic or on the shoulders of the flying suit or the casual uniform.

Squadron leaders are the lowest ranking officers that may fly a command flag. The flag may be depicted on the officer's aircraft or, should the squadron leader be in command, the flag may be flown from a flagpole or displayed on an official car as a car flag. If the squadron leader is in command of a numbered squadron, then the number of the squadron is also shown on the flag.

Other air forces
The rank of squadron leader is also used in a number of the air forces in the Commonwealth, including the Bangladesh Air Force (BAF), Ghana Air Force, Indian Air Force (IAF), Namibian Air Force, Sri Lanka Air Force (SLAF), Pakistan Air Force (PAF), Royal Australian Air Force (RAAF), Nigerian Air Force (NAF), and Royal New Zealand Air Force (RNZAF). It is also used in the Egyptian Air Force, Hellenic Air Force, Royal Air Force of Oman the Royal Thai Air Force and the Air Force of Zimbabwe.

Canada used the rank of squadron leader from 1920 to 1968.  With the unification of the Canadian Armed Forces in 1968, the air force rank titles were aligned to those of the Canadian Army with Canadian squadron leaders became majors while a common rank insignia was adopted. However, in 2015, the insignia for Canadian air force majors reverted to two and half strips of braid in pearl grey on black.

The Chilean Air Force equivalent rank, in Chilean Spanish, is comandante de escuadrilla or squadron commander.

Land forces
In the British Household Cavalry and Royal Armoured Corps, "squadron leader" is the title (but not the rank) often given to the commander of a squadron (company) of armoured fighting vehicles. The squadron leader is usually a major, although in the Second World War the post was often held by a captain.

See also

 Air force officer rank insignia
 British and U.S. military ranks compared
 Comparative military ranks
 RAF officer ranks
 Ranks of the RAAF

References

External links 
 RAF Command Flags

Military ranks of the Commonwealth
Military ranks of Australia
Former military ranks of Canada
Military ranks of the Royal Air Force
Air force ranks
Pakistan Air Force ranks
Military ranks of Bangladesh
Military ranks of Sri Lanka
1919 introductions
Military ranks of the Indian Air Force